Igor Vladimirovich Ivanov (Russian: Игорь Владимирович Иванов; born 9 May 1965), is a Russian politician who represented the executive authority of Primorsky Krai from 2004 to 2006 on the Federation Council.

Biography

Igor Ivanov was born on 9 May 1965 in the city of Biysk, Altai Krai. He served in the Soviet Airborne Forces, and took part in the Soviet–Afghan War.

Since 1989, he was a member of the management of various cooperative enterprises in Vladivostok. In 1991, he was appointed deputy director of the 777 commercial and industrial company. Between 1993 and 2001, he served as director and deputy director for development of Siberians in the Far East LLP, and, simultaneously from 1996 to 2001, he was the chairman of the board of directors of Vladkhleb OJSC. In 1993, he became the commercial director of Legion LLP.

In 1994, Ivanov graduated from the Academy of National Economy under the Government of Russia with a degree in financial management. In 1998, he earned a bachelor's degree from the Far Eastern State Maritime Academy. In 2001, he graduated from  the New Humanitarian University of Natalia Nesterova where he studied psychological sciences.

Political career
On 18 September 2001, Ivanov was appointed deputy governor of Primorsky Krai.

On 28 January 2004, Ivanov was vested with the powers of a member of the Federation Council, serving as a representative of the executive authority of Primorsky Krai.

On 26 May 2006, the Federation Council, on the initiative of Speaker Sergey Mironov, and on the basis of a statement by Ivanov himself, terminated Ivanov's senatorial powers ahead of schedule. The name of Senator Ivanov was mentioned in the press in connection with the investigation of abuses at the Vladivostok customs office, but the prosecutor's office did not bring any charges against him.

Personal life
Ivanov is married and has two children.

References

1965 births
Living people
United Russia politicians
Members of the Federation Council of Russia (after 2000)
People from Biysk
Personnel of the Soviet Airborne Forces
Russian Presidential Academy of National Economy and Public Administration alumni
Soviet military personnel of the Soviet–Afghan War